Wallace's Castle is a ruined castle located in Aberdeenshire, Scotland.

Located in the glen of Minonie, two fragments of wall remain of the castle. The castle was held by the Smith family in the 18th century.

Notes

Citations

References

Castles in Aberdeenshire
Ruined castles in Aberdeenshire